Dasyskenea is a genus of sea snails, marine gastropod mollusks in the family Skeneidae.

Species
Species within the genus Dasyskenea include:
 Dasyskenea dibellai Nofroni, Renda, Agamennone & Giacobbe, 2022
 Dasyskenea digeronimoi (La Perna, 1998)
 Dasyskenea nilarum (Engl, 1996)
 Dasyskenea suavis Fasulo & Cretella, 2002
 Dasyskenea victori (Segers, Swinnen & De Prins, 2009)

References

 Fasulo G. & Cretella M. (2003). Dasyskenea suavis gen. et sp. nov. (Gastropoda: Skeneidae). La Conchiglia 305: 31-34

External links

 
Skeneidae